Dirty Money may refer to:

Film 
 Dirty Money (1972 film), a 1972 Canadian film
Un flic, a 1972 French film also known as Dirty Money
 The Great Riviera Bank Robbery aka Dirty Money, a 1979 UK film

Music 
 Dirty Money (album), by UGK
 Dirty Money (group), hip-hop group created by Sean "Diddy" Combs

Television series 
 Dirty Money (2011 TV series), 2011 American reality television show
 Dirty Money (2018 TV series), 2018 American documentary series
 Dirty Money (game show), 2002 UK game show
 Dirty Money: The Story of the Criminal Assets Bureau, 2008 Irish crime series

See also 
 Counterfeit money
 Money laundering
 Dirty Sexy Money, 2007 American drama series